VC-7 Tallyhoers was an aircraft squadron of the United States Navy. It was located at Naval Air Station Miramar from 1964 to 1980. Its primary function was to help train aviators in attacking and shooting down enemy aircraft. VC-7 was established as VJ-1 on 4 December 1942. In 1946 it was redesignated VU-7, and on 2 July 1965 to VC-7. The Squadron was disestablished on 30 September 1980.

VC-7 aircraft towed targets and engaged trainee pilots in aerial dogfights.

Gallery

DEAD LINKS

External links
 VC-7 history on www.skyhawk.org
 VC-7 and the Development of Ait-to-Ground Rockets - Naval Aviation News (March–April 2003)

C-007